is a Japanese manga series written and illustrated by Nobuyuki Fukumoto. The first part was serialized in Kodansha's shōnen manga magazine Weekly Shōnen Magazine from September 2007 to March 2009, with its chapters collected in eight tankōbon volumes. The second part, Tobaku Haōden Zero: Gyanki-hen was serialized in the same magazine from July 2011 to May 2013, with its chapters collected in 10 volumes. The story revolves around gambling with high stakes, with focus on competition and rivalry.

Plot
Zero Ukai, a boy who causes a stir as a so-called "Robin Hood" of society, is invited along with his friends to the Dream Kingdom, a part-gambling part-amusement park under construction by the wealthy Muryō Zaizen. Zero and the others are brought together because Zaizen is in search of a "king," in other words his rep player, and he puts all his money on the line in order to succeed in that search, with the reward equaling no less than 100 billion yen. In order to save all the victims of the bank transfer scam with the prize money, Zero takes on the challenge to become the king, but the games are nothing short of the ultimate gambles of life, mind and body.

Characters

The Participants

He is 17 years old at the start of the series. When he was in middle school, he was an honor student in the extra-advanced class of Kainan Junior High, being one of the three brightest people in the class. He has a clear mind and good athletic nerves, and he can make an accurate judgment of situations even if put in a tight spot. He has an extremely strong sense of justice and considers his three companions to be one and the same as him, and at the same time, he shows kindness to everyone without regard to his own interests, such as offering timely help to Shirube, who was in a direct confrontation with him.
In the live-action TV series, he is changed into a 27–28 year old cram school lecturer, though much of his characteristics remains the same.

One of Zero's 'robin hood' companions. At first, he was antagonistic towards Zero for stopping him from committing suicide, but by joining Zero's pact, he comes to appreciate the fact that he has changed his life, which he thought was meaningless. While working as a robin hood, he seems to have developed a strong sense of justice, and he hopes to save all the victims of the bank transfer scam when he gets the bounty as a rep player. He does not appear in the live-action TV series.

One of Zero's 'robin hood' companions. He wears glasses and has a sullen but mild-mannered personality. Initially, he shows his selfishness and pretends to be aiming for the top like the other participants, but as he experiences the harshness of the games and the greatness of Zero, he becomes convinced that Zero should be the "king". As they continued to play the games, Zero advised him that it was dangerous for them to act together any longer, but they decided to continue because he wanted to see Zero through his fate for as long as possible and help him when he could.
In the live-action TV series, his role is taken over by a character named Hiroshi Sashima, who takes on several traits that originally belonged to Suezaki, such as his father being a diplomat.

One of Zero's 'robin hood' companions. He is noticeably more plump than the rest of Zero's friends and appears to have the strongest selfish desires of them all. Like with Yūki, Zero advised him to leave, and he parted ways with Zero in a half-hearted way, despite the fact that he couldn't survive without Zero's help due to his lack of strength. They later reunited in front of the venue for "The Lost Ring".

A yakuza who is the president of the bank transfer scam group that has been thwarted by Zero and the robin hoods. He was given the right to participate in the "test to decide the king" on Zaizen's whims. Despite playing a comic relief role most of the time, he also plays a major supporting role in giving Zero and the others sparks of inspiration. In the second arc, he teamed up with Zero to act as an intermediary for the games and as a manager, preparing the betting money. He also begins to speak mainly in a Kansai dialect.

The member of the bank transfer scam group. He is a shrewd, tall man and intellectual-type gangster who graduated from Keio University, and together with Suezaki, he has obtained the right to participate in Zaizen's test. He is treated as a younger brother figure to Suezaki, but perhaps because of Suezaki's own short-tempered nature, he secretly makes fun of him. He seems to respect those who are competent, and despite his aforementioned background, he truly appreciates the abilities of Zero and Shirube, who are younger than him.

A young boy whose real name and exact age are unknown. He is very intelligent and always maintains a composed attitude. At first glance, he appears to be cold, but deep down he holds a passionate desire to change the world, and he is willing to die to do so. He approaches Zero with a secret plan to defeat Zaizen, and promises to fight with him later on. He believes that it is young people like Zero and him who should lead the way in the times, not old people like Zaizen.

The Sponsors

The president of the Zaizen Group. He is Japan's richest man with more than 3 trillion yen in personal assets alone. Known by his nickname "Money God," he is 81 years old and uses a wheelchair. He was the organizer of the "test to decide the king" and scraped together blood relatives and influential people from all over Japan as participants. Seeing Zero and the others' qualities, he rescued them from their predicament, but since Zero was too wary to show his gratitude at the time, Zaizen came to dislike him. He has 365 mistresses tending to him on a daily basis, as well as children and grandchildren. Like Hyōdō in the Kaiji series, he is an extremely vicious sadist who takes great pleasure in injuring and killing disqualified people, and seems to value his innate "luck."
In the live-action TV series, he is 71 years old and does not show hostility towards Zero as much as in the original manga.

An executive of the Zaizen Group. He is 58 years old and the one who facilitates the test to decide the king. He presides over the Dream Kingdom and asks participants to take part in heinous gambles. However, he has never been unreasonable in his judging and acts fairly. He acknowledges that Zero is the best one of all, monitoring and favoring him over the other participants at the same time.
In the live-action TV series, he was changed to a young woman named Mineko Gotō. Although she acknowledges that Zero is one of the best talents in the world, she tends to dislike Zero to an unusual degree.

An old man who Zero fights against in the finger-cutting gamble. As a child, he suffered a serious injury to the right half of his face, which he hides with half his body and hair. In the case of gambling, he claims to have lost only once out of the many gambles he has participated in, and he faces Zero with absolute confidence, but there is a deep secret behind his win rate. He does not appear in the live-action TV series.

The DJ of the anchor gamble who wears clothes that seem to be of the punk fashion. Despite saying that his real name is "Kotarō Hill Mountain Williams Harrison Jaguar Satake James Shiroyama," his driver's license shows the above name. It is assumed by Zero that one of his parents might be American. Although he treats the participants with a friendly manner, in reality he is an ugly man who cannot hide his disgust at typical moving tales, hoping that the gambling process will destroy the bonds between the participating teams.

Gyanki-hen

A collegiate golf champion that Zero has to play against in an early morning golf game. He is a nice young man in public, but he looks down on others deep down.

The self-proclaimed "Invincible Poker Queen" who sends a challenge letter to an underworld gambling contracting site set up by Zero. All her teeth, besides the front teeth, are canine. She is self-confident and only listens to reasons that are convenient to her, and takes great pleasure in pulling out all the teeth of the losers in a "100-card poker" game that she devised and crafted to her advantage. Her role as an opponent is replaced with Mineko in the TV drama series.

A thirteen year old boy who was present at the scene of the beer-pouring match between Zero and the entertainment company president. Impressed by Zero's tact and sense of justice, he asks him to decipher the cryptogram "Yukichi's Soliloquy," which is believed to belong to his grandfather Kijūrō. He doesn't have any particular talent, but he does have a good sense of things.

The senior managing director of Hōō Corporation, one of Japan's top-class giant corporations. She is Kijūrō's eldest daughter and Naoki's mother. She is unclingy by nature and seems to have little interest in her father's wealth, and is also quite an airhead.

The president of Hōō Corporation, he is Kijūrō's eldest son and Sawako's older brother. He proposes that if Yukichi's soliloquy reveals the location of the hidden fortune, the distribution of the fortune will be first come first served, and he attempts to take all of it by using Hōō's ability to get things done and Tatsuki's intellect. 

Takamitsu's son. He is 13 years old, just like his cousin Naoki, but he is a genius who skipped a grade to attend the Massachusetts Institute of Technology in his third year. He believes that humanity's greatest treasure is its intellect, and he dreams of beating Shirube and Zero, who are considered to be the pinnacle of genius. He hears that Zero is trying to decipher Yukichi's soliloquy, so he joins the competition and confronts Zero.

The senior managing director of Hōō Corporation. He was called founder Kijūrō's right-hand man, and claimed that "Yukichi's soliloquy" might be a sign of an SOS from him.

The founder of Hōō Corporation. He had been locked up for three years, but he saw through the fact that the culprit was Takamitsu. His age is in his eighties (the same age as Zaizen), but his physical abilities are unimaginable for his age, such as showing Zero and the others a forward somersault immediately after rescue, and claiming that he can do a backward somersault if he is so inclined. In spite of being a wealthy and eccentric person, he is a good man who is adored by everyone, which is a rarity in Fukumoto's works.

The deceased wife of Kijūrō, the mother of Takamitsu and Sawako and the grandmother of Naoki and Tatsuki. She used to have feelings for Zaizen, but when Zaizen became a billionaire and confessed to her, she was already attracted to Kijūrō.

Media

Manga
Written and illustrated by Nobuyuki Fukumoto, Gambling Emperor Legend Zero was serialized in Kodansha's shōnen manga magazine Weekly Shōnen Magazine from September 5, 2007, to February 25, 2009. Its chapters were collected in eight tankōbon volumes, released from November 11, 2007, to April 17, 2009.

A second arc, was serialized in Weekly Shōnen Magazine from July 13, 2011, to May 29, 2013. Its chapters were collected in ten tankōbon volumes, released from October 17, 2011, to July 17, 2013.

In June 2020, Manga Planet announced the digital English-language publication of the manga. It was planned to start on June 23, 2020, however, it was postponed to November 17, 2020.

Volume list

Gambling Emperor Legend Zero

Tobaku Haōden Zero: Gyanki-hen

Drama
A 10-episode Japanese television drama adaptation titled , also known as ZERO -The Bravest Money Game-, aired every Sunday evening from July 15 to September 16, 2018 on NTV's Sunday Drama block. The drama stars NEWS's Shigeaki Kato as Zero. After each episode finished airing, they later became available for video distribution on Hulu. The spin-off Zero: Episode ZERO, which depicts the past lives of the characters, also became available on the site.

See also
Gambling in Japan

Notes

References

Further reading

External links
 

2007 manga
2018 Japanese television series debuts
2018 Japanese television series endings
Action anime and manga
Anime and manga about gambling
Kodansha manga
Manga adapted into television series
Manga series
Nippon TV dramas
Nobuyuki Fukumoto
Shōnen manga